Louise Charron,  (born March 2, 1951) is a Canadian jurist. She was appointed to the Supreme Court of Canada in October, 2004, and is the first native-born Franco-Ontarian Supreme Court judge. (This distinction has sometimes been attributed to Louise Arbour, but Arbour was born and raised Québécoise.)

Born in Sturgeon Falls, Ontario, Charron received a Bachelor of Arts degree from Carleton University in 1972, her Bachelor of Law degree from the University of Ottawa in 1975, and was called to the Bar of Ontario in 1977. She practiced civil litigation before joining the Crown Attorney's office in 1980. She then became a law professor at the University of Ottawa.

She was appointed to the District Court of Ontario in 1988 and to the Court of Appeal for Ontario in 1995. Though she was eligible to sit on the bench until 2026, her retirement was announced in May 2011, and became effective August 30, 2011. She was appointed a Companion of the Order of Canada on December 30, 2012.

See also
Reasons of the Supreme Court of Canada by Justice Charron

References

External links

Justices of the Supreme Court of Canada
Canadian legal scholars
Academic staff of the University of Ottawa
University of Ottawa alumni
Carleton University alumni
Franco-Ontarian people
1951 births
Living people
Canadian women judges
People from West Nipissing
Lawyers in Ontario
Constitutional court women judges
Companions of the Order of Canada
University of Ottawa Faculty of Law alumni
Women legal scholars